The 1874 Massachusetts gubernatorial election was held on November 3, 1874. Republican acting Governor Thomas Talbot, who took office after the resignation of William B. Washburn, was defeated by Democrat William Gaston, a former Mayor of Boston.

Gaston was the first Democrat elected Governor since George S. Boutwell in 1852 and received the largest share of the vote for any Democrat in the state since the party's founding in 1828.

Republican nomination

Candidates
George B. Loring, State Senator from Salem
Thomas Talbot, acting Governor since April 1874

Campaign
Talbot, who had only become acting Governor in April, was by no means guaranteed re-nomination by the Republicans. No candidate, including Talbot, actively sought office, but a number of alternatives were mentioned. Among those suggested were Alexander H. Rice, Henry L. Dawes, George Frisbie Hoar, and Henry L. Pierce. Talbot was thought of as the weakest Republican candidate possible on the basis of his vetoes of liquor regulation; even the prohibitionist governors William Claflin and William Washburn had accepted a tacit agreement that they would not override the legislature's will on liquor.

A proposal was made for Talbot to run for Congress in the vacant seat of Ebenezer R. Hoar, with Rice running for Governor, and Henry L. Dawes for U.S. Senate. Talbot rejected this plan, as did opponents of Rice and Dawes.

Representative Benjamin Butler, who ran for the position in 1871 and had become a kingmaker in Massachusetts politics, largely stayed out of the race.

Convention
At the Republican convention in Worcester on October 7, Talbot was nominated on the first ballot with the support of Dawes and Hoar. Some suggested that their support was exchanged for Talbot's endorsement of Dawes for U.S. Senate in the coming 1875 election.

General election

Results

See also
 1874 Massachusetts legislature

References

Governor
1874
Massachusetts
November 1874 events